181 is a 2022 Indian Tamil-language horror film directed by Mohamad Issack and starring Gemini Ryker, Rheena Krishnan, Kavya and Vijay Chandra in the lead roles. It was released on 16 December 2022.

Cast
Gemini Ryker
Rheena Krishnan
Kavya
Vijay Chandra

Production
The film marked Mohamad Issack's fourth project after the horror films Agadam (2014), Seesa (2016) and Nagesh Thiraiyarangam (2018). Shot throughout 2021, the film was promoted as a record-breaking venture for having a screenplay that was written in 12 hours.

Reception
The film was released on 16 December 2022 across Tamil Nadu. A critic from Maalai Malar gave the film 2.25 out of 5 stars, and labelled the film "low on thrills". A reviewer from Dina Thanthi also gave the film an unfavourable review. Film critic Malini Mannath wrote "while the director’s interest in setting up records is understandable, it would do him good if he concentrated more on the quality of his product by crafting a screenplay in a way more interesting and appealing to his audience."

References

2022 films
2020s Tamil-language films